Jonathan Lyne (24 February 1990) is an Irish sportsperson. He plays Gaelic football with his local club Killarney Legion and was a member of the senior Kerry county team from 2014.

Lyne started at right half-back for Kerry in the 2015 All-Ireland Senior Football Championship Final defeat to Dublin.	

He is a cousin of Pat Spillane. His younger brother Damien died suddenly in Killarney in 2020.

Lyne confirmed his retirement from inter-county football on 1 January 2021. Though he played often in 2020, he was not involved in the 2020 Munster Senior Football Championship semi-final defeat to Cork.

References

1990 births
Living people
Kerry inter-county Gaelic footballers
Killarney Legion Gaelic footballers
Jonathan